Microcentrus is a genus of treehoppers in the family Membracidae. There are about 10 described species in Microcentrus.

Species
These 10 species belong to the genus Microcentrus:
 Microcentrus auritus Ball 1933 c g
 Microcentrus caryae (Fitch, 1851) c g b (hickory stegaspidine treehopper)
 Microcentrus cornutus Fowler c g
 Microcentrus lynx Ball 1933 c g
 Microcentrus nicholi Ball 1933 c g
 Microcentrus perdita Amyot & Serville c g
 Microcentrus perditus b
 Microcentrus pileatus Fowler c g
 Microcentrus proximus Fowler c g
 Microcentrus sordidus Fowler c g
Data sources: i = ITIS, c = Catalogue of Life, g = GBIF, b = Bugguide.net

References

Further reading

External links

 

Stegaspidinae
Auchenorrhyncha genera